"Macarena" is the Spanish name of a religious statue in Seville. It is also a 1993 song by Los del Río and the dance devised for it.

Macarena may also refer to:

 Macarena (name), Spanish given name
 Virgin of Hope of Macarena, Catholic Virgin from Seville, Spain
 "Macarena", a song by Damso
 "Macarena", a song by Pietro Lombardi
 The Macarena (drag queen), Spanish drag queen

Places
 Macarena, Seville, a neighborhood in Seville, Spain
 Puerta de la Macarena (Seville), a wall gate in Seville
 La Macarena, Meta, a village in Meta Department, Colombia
 Serranía de la Macarena, a mountain range in Colombia

See also
 Maracena, a municipality located in the province of Granada, Spain
 Macaranga, a genus of Old World tropical trees